{{Infobox newspaper
| name                 = Glasgow Times
| logo                 = 
| logo_size            = 
| logo_alt             = 
| image                = GlasgowTimes.jpg
| image_size           = 270px
| image_alt            = 
| caption              = 
| motto                = "Nobody knows our city better"
| type                 = Daily newspaper (Two editions: Late News Edition and Late News Extra)
| format               = Tabloid
| owner                = Newsquest
| founder              = 
| publisher            = Herald & Times Group
| president            = 
| editor               = Callum Baird
| chiefeditor          = 
| depeditor            = 
| assoceditor          = 
| maneditor            = 
| generalmanager       = 
| newseditor           = 
| managingeditordesign = 
| campuseditor         = 
| campuschief          = 
| metroeditor          = 
| metrochief           = 
| opeditor             = 
| sportseditor         = 
| photoeditor          = 
| staff                = 
| foundation           = 1876
| political            = None
| language             = English
| ceased publication   = 
| relaunched           = 
| headquarters         = 
| circulation          = 20,874 daily
| circulation_date     = July to December 2017
| circulation_ref      = 
| readership           = 
| sister newspapers    = Sunday HeraldThe HeraldThe National
| ISSN                 = 0307-5745
| oclc                 = 
| RNI                  = 
| website              = 
| free                 = 
| dirinteractive       = 
| publishing_country   = Scotland
| publishing_city      = Glasgow
}}
The Glasgow Times is an evening tabloid newspaper published Monday to Saturday in the city of Glasgow, Scotland. Called The Evening Times from 1876, it was rebranded as the Glasgow Times on 4 December 2019.City daily officially drops ‘evening’ from name as part of relaunch, HoldTheFrontPage, 4 December 2019

History
The paper, an evening sister paper of The Herald, was established in 1876. The paper's slogan is "Nobody Knows Our City Better".

Publication of the Evening Times (and its sister paper) moved to a Charles Rennie Mackintosh building in Mitchell Street in 1868. The building is now the Lighthouse, Scotland's Centre for Architecture, Design and the City.

In 1964, publishers George Outram were bought by Sir Hugh Fraser. In 1979, the ownership was acquired by Tiny Rowland's Lonrho.

On 19 July 1980, the paper moved to offices at 195 Albion Street, a black-fronted building modelled after the Black Lubyanka building of the Daily Express in London's Fleet Street. The Albion Street building had previously housed the Scottish Daily News workers' cooperative from May to November 1975.

A management buy-out in May 1992 created Caledonian Newspapers, later purchased by Scottish Television in 1996. After the purchase the TV group renamed itself "Scottish Media Group", which was later shortened to SMG and, in 2008, rebranded as STV Group plc.

BusinessThe Glasgow Times and The Herald are owned by Newsquest (a division of Gannett), which acquired it with the purchase of the publishing arm of the Scottish Media Group in 2003 for £216million. 
Newsquest also owns the Scottish Jobs website s1jobs.com

Distribution
The newspaper is sold in trademark vendor stalls around Glasgow City Centre, with the salesmen calling out the well-known slogan "Times! Evening Times!" every few minutes. In addition it is delivered to doors around Glasgow by paper boys and girls, and is also sold in numerous stores around Greater Glasgow.

Other publicationsThe Glasgow Times gives its name to an annual pocket-sized Scottish football publication called the Wee Red Book'', which contains both the following season's fixtures in Scotland's four senior divisions and lists of previous league and cup winners from Scotland, England and Europe.

References

Publications established in 1876
Newspapers published in Scotland
Mass media in Glasgow
Newspapers published by Newsquest
1876 establishments in Scotland
Evening newspapers
Daily newspapers published in the United Kingdom